Visari may refer to:

Visari (surname), a surname from the Native American Tzotzil language common in southern Mexico
Scolar Visari, the fictional antagonist and leader of the Helghast in the Killzone videogame series